Kujalleq (Greenlandic:) is a municipality on the southern tip of Greenland, operational from 1 January 2009. The administrative center of the municipality is in Qaqortoq (formerly called Julianehåb).

Creation
The municipality consists of the former municipalities of southern Greenland, each named after the biggest settlement:
 Nanortalik Municipality
 Narsaq Municipality
 Qaqortoq Municipality

In addition to the area of these municipalities, uninhabited parts of the former municipalities of Paamiut and Ammassalik were added to the new administrative entity. In the case of Paamiut Municipality, it was exclusively a part of the ice sheet including a few nunataks, while in the case of Ammassalik Municipality, it included the coast from the fjord Kangerlussuatsiaq (in Danish Lindenow Fjord) on the old border with Nanortalik Municipality in the south to north of Timmiarmiut.

Coat of arms
The coat of arms of the municipality depicts a ram's head, symbolising the sheep farming in the area, which has become one of the most important parts of Kujalleq's economy. The uppermost part of the shield contains the sun of the Greenlandic flag. Likewise the choice of colours matches those of the country's flag. The coat of arms was adopted in August 2008.

Geography 

At  of area Kujalleq is the smallest municipality in Greenland by area. Straddling the southernmost end of the island of Greenland, it is bordered by only one municipality, Sermersooq, in the north. The waters of the western coast are that of Labrador Sea, which meet the open North Atlantic at Uummannarsuaq, the southern cape. The border on the western coast runs alongside Alanngorsuaq Fjord and on the eastern coast up to Anorituup Kangerlua (Anoritoq) Fjord.

The entire municipal area is highly mountainous, with numerous fjords carving deeply into the land. All settlements are located on the western coast, or in fjords ending there.

Politics
Kujalleq's municipal council consists of 15 members, elected every four years.

Municipal council

Administrative divisions

Nanortalik area
 Nanortalik (Nennortalik)
 Aappilattoq
 Alluitsup Paa (Sydprøven)
 Ammassivik (Sletten)
 Narsaq Kujalleq (Narsaq Kujalleq, Frederiksdal)
 Tasiusaq
 Qorlortorsuaq

Narsaq area
 Narsaq (Nordprøven)
 Igaliku (Igaliko)
 Narsarsuaq
 Qassiarsuk

Qaqortoq area
 Qaqortoq (Julianehåb)
 Eqalugaarsuit
 Qassimiut
 Saarloq
Upernaviarsuk

Transportation 

The only airport is Narsarsuaq Airport. Helicopters and boats go to other settlements.

International relations

Twin Town — Sister City
Kujalleq is twinned with:
  Aarhus in Denmark

See also 
 KANUKOKA, the Greenlandic municipal association
 Eastern Settlement, the former Norse settlement in the area
 Lichtenfels & Lichtenau, former Moravian missions in the area
 Narsaq massacre

References 

 
Municipalities of Greenland
Populated places established in 2009
2009 establishments in Greenland